Hols may refer to:

 Hols: Prince of the Sun, a Japanese anime film
 Holidays
 House of Large Sizes, an American alternative rock band

See also 
 Hol (disambiguation)